The women's 200m Freestyle event at the 2006 Central American and Caribbean Games occurred on Thursday, July 20, 2006 at the S.U. Pedro de Heredia Aquatic Complex in Cartagena, Colombia.

Records

Results

Final

Preliminaries

References

Results: 2006 CACs--Swimming: Women's 200 Freestyle--prelims from the official website of the 2006 Central American and Caribbean Games; retrieved 2009-07-05.
Results: 2006 CACs--Swimming: Women's 200 Freestyle--finals from the official website of the 2006 Central American and Caribbean Games; retrieved 2009-07-05.

Freestyle, Women's 200m
2006 in women's swimming